Unitsa is a village in Republic of Karelia, Russia, on a bank of Unitskaya Gulf of Lake Onega. The same name also belongs to a nearby railway station.

Rural localities in the Republic of Karelia
Kondopozhsky District